Željko Župetić (born 23 September 1967) is a retired Croatian football midfielder. During his professional career he mainly played for Zagreb in Croatia’s Prva HNL. He also spent one and a half years in Israel.

International career
Župetić also earned one cap for Croatia in June 1991 against Slovenia. The game was unofficial however, as Croatia was still part of Yugoslavia at the time.

References

External links
 
 

1967 births
Living people
Footballers from Zagreb
Association football midfielders
Yugoslav footballers
Croatian footballers
Croatia international footballers
NK Zagreb players
Hapoel Haifa F.C. players
Hapoel Rishon LeZion F.C. players
HNK Rijeka players
Yugoslav Second League players
Croatian Football League players
Liga Leumit players
First Football League (Croatia) players
Second Football League (Croatia) players
Croatian expatriate footballers
Expatriate footballers in Israel
Croatian expatriate sportspeople in Israel